The Morgan State Bears lacrosse team was the only lacrosse team established to play NCAA-level lacrosse at a historically black institution. The team, from Baltimore, Maryland, defeated schools like Harvard and Notre Dame and upset a #1 ranked team in 1975. The team's exploits are recounted in the book Ten Bears, and the story is in production for a major motion picture.

Background
Morgan State University was founded and chartered in 1867 as the Centenary Biblical Institute. It was built on its present site, in northeast Baltimore, in 1890 and was known as Morgan College from 1890 to 1938. It became a public college in 1939, as Morgan State College. In the 1950s and 1960s, enrollment swelled as African Americans of the baby boom generation sought post high school degrees but were limited by segregation to black colleges and universities like Morgan, Howard, Grambling or Morehouse. (In 1975, the college was renamed Morgan State University by the state legislature, reflecting its expanded mission and scope.) By the 1960s, Morgan and Grambling had reached the pinnacle of college football, African-American athletes were still unable to attend most white schools, thus concentrating their numbers and talents at a handful of black schools. Several dozen notable NFL players and Hall of Famers hailed from these schools.

The late 1960s were turbulent years with regard to race relations in the United States. Riots had broken out in major cities across the country, with at least three in Maryland. Dr. Martin Luther King Jr. had been assassinated and formerly all white universities and colleges were opening their doors to African-Americans for the first time. But the major lacrosse powers like Johns Hopkins, Navy and Maryland still fielded mostly white teams.

Ironically, by 1975 Morgan became noted for its lacrosse team because black high school lacrosse players from Maryland and New York still had trouble getting into the major white lacrosse colleges and universities. Morgan was the first (and until the turn of the 21st century) the only historically black university to field a lacrosse team.

The team was formed in 1970 when a former Baltimore high school lacrosse player and Morgan grad student, Howard "Chip" Silverman, realized that many of black Baltimore's high school lacrosse players were at Morgan, but were not playing lacrosse. Silverman had never coached before, but, he put up flyers around campus, and 30 athletes showed up for a meeting.  Two-thirds were football players. Some would later star in the NFL, such as Stan Cherry. Silverman started the lacrosse club and two years later petitioned the NCAA for full membership as a college team. At that time, the NCAA had its best 40 teams in Division I and another 80 teams in Division II. It was Division II that Morgan would soon dominate.

Accomplishments
During the period 1970 to 1975, the Bears were ranked in the nation's top 25 in four out of five years. They made the championship tournament twice, and in 1975 were involved in one of the great upsets in intercollegiate sports history, when Morgan defeated then #1 ranked Washington and Lee University, a lacrosse team which would eventually reach the NCAA Division I semi-finals as the number seven seed. Washington & Lee had not lost a regular season or home game the prior two seasons.

After the 1975 season, Silverman retired as the Bears lacrosse coach, and Morgan never again had a winning season. By 1981 Title IX funding priorities required university athletic funds be equally distributed among women's programs and the school dropped lacrosse in 1981.

The 1981 Bear's Team featured some of the most talented players in the nation. Gene White, who would later coach the newly formed club team in 2005, and Lou Carter where NCAA Top 25 scoring leaders while goalie Cedric White was in the NCAA Top 10 in goals blocked during the season. In addition, there were a core of freshmen and sophomores who had played the game at early ages that gave the team even more potential for the next seasons that would not be.   As a testament to the Bear's legacy, the 1981 team coached by National Lacrosse Hall of Fame inductee (2005) Sheldon Freed, defeated Notre Dame (13-12), Villanova (16-9), Michigan State and Georgetown in the span of a five-day schedule during the middle of the season. and lost to Loyola in the NCAA Division II Championship Semi-Finals to end an era.

Morgan State University Division II / III All-Americans
As listed by the United States Intercollegiate Lacrosse Association:
 1971 - Wayne Jackson 
 1972 - Wayne Jackson 
 1973 - Wayne Jackson 
 1974 - Dave Raymond and Courtenay Servary 
 1975 - Dave Raymond, Courtenay Servary and Tyrone Jones 
 1976 - Joe Fowlkes 
 1977 - Joe Fowlkes 
 1978 - Joe Fowlkes

Morgan State University Representatives in the North/South Game
As listed by the United States Intercollegiate Lacrosse Association:

 1971 - Miles Harrison
 1973 - Wayne Jackson
 1975 - Dave Raymond
 1978 - Joe Fowlkes
 1981 - Mike McBride

Special Honor
In 2015, US Lacrosse announced that it would create a permanent exhibit in its new museum to honor the Morgan State lacrosse team.

Alumni Updates
Stan Cherry was signed as a linebacker in the National Football League.

Both Tony Fulton and Curt Anderson were elected to the Maryland House of Delegates

Three time all-American Joe Fowlkes became a security consultant, while George Kelley went into law enforcement.

Dr. Miles Harrison and Coach Chip Silverman collaborated on the book, Ten Bears, which is being made into a movie. Silverman died in March 2008. Dr. Harrison's son, Kyle Harrison, was the #1 draft pick of Major League Lacrosse in 2005, after leading Johns Hopkins to a national championship the same year and winning the Tewaaraton trophy.

Two documentaries have been shot on the team, one, produced by Jeremy Schaap, aired on ESPN in 2006 and the second, produced by Luke David, airs on PBS in early April, 2008.

21st-century comeback

More than 20 years after the original team was shut down, Morgan returned to lacrosse. In 2005 a lacrosse club team was formed on campus and is awaiting acceptance into the NCAA. Coach Gene White, a player from the original incarnation, commented, "I think it is the greatest thing that has happened since I played for Morgan in '81". The 2005 club was not a sanctioned team in NCAA competition, but they did play exhibition games against teams that were.

"Meanwhile, the team plays in the National College Lacrosse League. The team is now coached by Bill Krehnbrink who volunteers his services for Coppin State University.

Season-by-season results

References

References

External links
Videos uploaded to Vimeo (2016):
 The Morgan State University Lacrosse Team (1970-1981): One-on-One with Coach Sheldon Freed

Videos uploaded to YouTube (2015):
 1979 Photos/Georgetown, Villanova and William & Mary
 1979 - The Rebuilding Year
 The 1980 Game Between Morgan and Montclair State
 1981 - The Final Season
 10 Bears 4 Life
 Our History and Legacy
 The United States Intercollegiate Lacrosse Association Honorees
 Many Men But One Team
 If You Hear Any Noise, It's Just Me and the Boys
 The 10/17/2015 Last Team Photo and Lunch

College men's lacrosse teams in the United States
Lacrosse
Lacrosse teams in Maryland
Lacrosse in Baltimore
1970 establishments in Maryland
Lacrosse clubs established in 1970